Cryptobias coccineus is a species of beetle in the family Cerambycidae, the only species in the genus Cryptobias.

References

Trachyderini
Monotypic Cerambycidae genera